Eivind Eriksen (born 28 February 1973 in Mehamn) is a Norwegian former footballer who played as a forward for the clubs Hamarkameratene, Nordkinn, Hammerfest, Bodø/Glimt, Hønefoss and Åmot.

Club career 

Eriksen played for Hamarkameratene in 1996, but played no league games, and moved to Nordkinn FK the following year. In 1997, Eriksen moved to Hammerfest FK, where he scored a record breaking 40 goals in the 1997 season. In 1999 he moved to Bodø/Glimt, where he scored his first Tippeligaen goal on 10 April 1999 in the match against Vålerenga (1–1).

He continued to play for Bodø/Glimt in the Tippeligaen for the next three seasons, but moved on to Hønefoss in winter 2002. He made his debut for Hønefoss in the Norwegian First Division on 14 April 2002 in a match against Åsane. His first league goal for Hønefoss came at home against Skeid on 21 April of the same year (1–2). In total, he played 33 league games and scored eight goals across three seasons for Hønefoss.

In 2005 he chose to return to Hammerfest FK. For the next two seasons, he played for Åmot before choosing to hang up his boots.

References

External links 
 Player profile at Altomfotball.no
 Player profile at Sjeik.no
 Player profile at Footballdatabase.eu
 Player profile at National-football-teams.com

Norwegian footballers
Hamarkameratene players
FK Bodø/Glimt players
Hønefoss BK players
People from Gamvik
1973 births
Living people
Eliteserien players
Association football forwards
Association football midfielders
Sportspeople from Troms og Finnmark